Ryan Jensen (born June 13, 1991) is an American football center for the Tampa Bay Buccaneers of the National Football League (NFL). He was drafted by the Baltimore Ravens in the sixth round of the 2013 NFL Draft.

Early years
Jensen was born in Rangely, Colorado, and attended Fort Morgan High School. He was selected to the All-State first-team while in high school. He also was named to the all-conference.

College career
In his sophomore season, he was selected to the All-Rocky Mountain Athletic Conference Second-team along with being selected to the All-Colorado Second-team by National Football Foundation.

Jensen was a Gene Upshaw Award finalist in his senior year at Colorado State University Pueblo.  He finished fifth in the voting.

Jensen was also selected to participate in the 2013 Texas vs. the Nation all-star game following his senior season.

Professional career

Baltimore Ravens
Jensen was drafted by the Ravens in the sixth round with the 203rd overall pick in the 2013 NFL Draft.

On August 30, 2014, Jensen was released by the Ravens and was signed to the practice squad the next day. He was promoted to the active roster on December 16, 2014.

Jensen became a full-time starter for the Ravens in 2017, starting in all 16 games at center.

Tampa Bay Buccaneers
On March 19, 2018, Jensen signed a four-year, $42 million contract with the Tampa Bay Buccaneers with $22 million guaranteed, making him the highest paid center in the NFL, as Ali Marpet moved from center to left guard to accommodate him.  He was the Buccaneers' center in their Super Bowl LV victory on February 7, 2021.
Jensen was among the three Tampa Bay Buccaneers offensive linemen to be named to the National Football Conference 2021 Pro Bowl roster, a first for all three.

On March 14, 2022, Jensen signed a three-year, $39 million contract extension with the Buccaneers. On July 28, 2022, Jensen experienced a severe knee injury during Buccaneers training camp and had to be carted off the field. He was placed on injured reserve on September 1, 2022. He was activated for the wild card round of the playoffs on January 16, 2023.

References

External links

Tampa Bay Buccaneers bio
CSU–Pueblo ThunderWolves bio

1991 births
Living people
American football centers
American football offensive guards
American football offensive tackles
Baltimore Ravens players
CSU Pueblo ThunderWolves football players
People from Fort Morgan, Colorado
People from Rangely, Colorado
Players of American football from Colorado
Tampa Bay Buccaneers players
National Conference Pro Bowl players